Auranticarpa rhombifolia is a rainforest tree of eastern Australia. Known as the diamond leaf pittosporum, this tree is planted in many parts of Australia as an ornamental. The white flowers and orange fruit make it a most appealing street or garden tree. Other common names include hollywood, diamond leaf laurel, white myrtle and white holly.

Australian botanists recently examined the large genus Pittosporum and decided the more northerly examples are significantly different from those in the south. Subsequently, a new genus was created Auranticarpa, which means "gold fruit".

The range of natural distribution is on red–brown basaltic soils from Richmond River, New South Wales (28° S) to Forty Mile Scrub National Park (18° S) in tropical Queensland.

Description 
A small tree, up to 25 metres in height and a trunk diameter of 45 cm. The bark is grey, irregular, not smooth and almost corky. Leaves alternate, toothed in uneven patterns in the top half of the leaf. Not toothed closer to the stem. Rhomboid in shape, 5 to 10 cm long and 4 to 7 cm wide. Midrib, lateral and net veins easily seen on both the upper and lower leaf surface.

Flowers and fruit
Small white flowers occur in a terminal corymb from November to January. Fruit is an orange pear shaped capsule, 9 mm long with two or three oval black seeds. Fruits mature from February to May. Germination from fresh seed is slow, taking up to four months with around a third of seeds sending out roots and shoots.

Uses 
A very popular ornamental tree. It needs a well-drained soil. Full sun is required for a significant display of orange fruit.

References

  (other publication details, included in citation)
 Native Plants, Global Book Publishing. , published 2008 page 218
 PlantNET – The Plant Information Network System of Botanic Gardens Trust, Sydney, Australia – 16 July 2009. http://plantnet.rbgsyd.nsw.gov.au/cgi-bin/NSWfl.pl?page=nswfl&lvl=sp&name=Auranticarpa~rhombifolia

Pittosporaceae
Flora of New South Wales
Flora of Queensland
Apiales of Australia
Trees of Australia
Taxa named by Allan Cunningham (botanist)
Garden plants of Australia
Ornamental trees